The Flannery Baronetcy, of Wethersfield Manor in the County of Essex, was a title in the Baronetage of the United Kingdom. It was created on 13 December 1904 for the engineer, naval architect and politician Sir James Fortescue Flannery. The title became extinct on the death of the second Baronet in 1959.

Flannery baronets, of Wethersfield Manor (1904)

Sir James Fortescue-Flannery, 1st Baronet (1851–1943)
Sir Harold Fortescue Flannery, 2nd Baronet (1883–1959)

References

Extinct baronetcies in the Baronetage of the United Kingdom